Henningsen Glacier is a glacier  long, flowing southwest to the south coast of South Georgia between Cape Darnley and Rocky Bay. It was surveyed in the period 1951–57 by the South Georgia Survey expedition led by Duncan Carse, and was named by the UK Antarctic Place-Names Committee for Leonard Henningsen, Manager of Tønsbergs Hvalfangeri, Husvik, 1945–50.

See also
 List of glaciers in the Antarctic
 Glaciology

References

Glaciers of South Georgia